Pitcairnia rubiginosa is a species of flowering plant in the family Bromeliaceae, native to northern South America (northern Brazil, Colombia, French Guiana, Guyana and Venezuela). It was first described by John Gilbert Baker in 1889.

References

rubiginosa
Flora of Brazil
Flora of Colombia
Flora of French Guiana
Flora of Guyana
Flora of Venezuela
Plants described in 1889